KBFC (93.5 FM) is a radio station licensed to serve Forrest City, Arkansas, United States. The station, established in 1960, is owned and operated by the Forrest City Broadcasting Company.

Programming
KBFC broadcasts a country music format and features programming from USA Radio News. In addition to its usual music programming, KBFC airs regional and local news as well as a morning show in simulcast with sister station KXJK.  KBFC broadcasts Arkansas Razorbacks football and men's basketball games.

History
This station began broadcast operations on September 22, 1960, as an FM simulcast of Forrest City Broadcasting Company sister station KXJK (950 AM).  The station was assigned the KBFC call sign by the Federal Communications Commission.

Originally broadcasting with just 670 watts of effective radiated power, KBFC upgraded its signal to 3,000 watts in 1970.  In 1991, the FCC granted the station a new construction permit to relocate its broadcast tower and upgrade to 25,000 watts as a Class C3 station. KBFC began licensed broadcasting from the new site in July 1992.

On December 28, 2020, KBFC began broadcasting in HD. The HD-1 channel is the Delta Country format while HD-2 rebroadcasts KXJK AM 950.

Staff
General Manager: Rob Johnson
Assistant Manager/Sports Director: Richard Benson
News Director: Rick Holt
Administrative Assistant: Berta McMahon
Engineer: Palmer Johnson
On-Air Personality: J. Fred Houston

References

External links

BFC
Country radio stations in the United States
Radio stations established in 1960
Forrest City, Arkansas
1960 establishments in Arkansas